A maenianum was a balcony or gallery for spectators at a public show in ancient Rome. The name was originally given by censor Gaius Maenius in 318 BC to the decorated gallery in the Colosseum, where spectators watched gladiatorial combats.

The maenianum was divided into several levels: maenianum primum, which was reserved for the non-senatorial noble class called the equites. The maenianum secundum, which featured the better, lower seats for the wealthy plebeians; and maenianum summum with the upper seats for the poor plebeians.<ref>Codex Justinian 8:10:11. Imperatores Honorius], Theodosius: Maeniana, quae Graece εξωστας appellant, immersive olim Constructa sive in posterum in provinciis construenda, nisi spatium inter se by decem pedestinations liberi Aeris habuerint, MODIS omnibus detruncentur. .fr / DroitRomain / Corpus / CJ8.htm # 10</ref>

Literature
 Maenius. In: Karl Ernst Georges: Concise Latin-German pocket dictionary. 8th edition. Volume 2, Hannover 1918, Sp. 755 (online).
 KIP | 3 | 864 ||| Walter Hatto Gross
 Philip Smith: maenianum.  In: William Smith: . A Dictionary of Greek and Roman Antiquities '' John Murray, London, 1875. 723 S. ([https://penelope.uchicago.edu/Thayer/ E / novel / text / secondary / SMIGRA * /).

References 

Architectural terminology
Ancient Roman architecture